The leukotriene (LT) receptors are G protein-coupled receptors that bind and are activated by the leukotrienes. They include the following proteins:

 Leukotriene B4 receptors (BLTRs) – bind to and are activated by LTB4:
 BLT1 (Leukotriene B4 receptor 1)  – 
 BLT2 (Leukotriene B4 receptor 2)  – 
 Cysteinyl leukotriene receptors (CysLTRs) – bind to and are activated by LTC4, LTD4, and LTE4:
 CysLT1 (Cysteinyl leukotriene receptor 1) – 
 CysLT2 (Cysteinyl leukotriene receptor 2) – 

The recently elucidated CysLTE, represented by GPR99/OXGR1, may constitute a third CysLTR.

See also
 Eicosanoid receptor
 Oxoeicosanoid receptor
 Prostaglandin receptor
 Thromboxane receptor

References

External links
 IUPHAR GPCR Database – Leukotriene receptors
 

Eicosanoids
G protein-coupled receptors